John Armstrong Smith (September 23, 1814 – March 7, 1892) was an American lawyer and politician who served two terms as a U.S. Representative from Ohio from 1869 to 1873.

Biography 
Born in Hillsboro, Ohio, Smith pursued classical studies and was graduated from Miami University, Oxford, Ohio, in 1834.
He studied law.
He was admitted to the bar in 1835 and commenced practice in Hillsboro, Ohio.
He served in the State house of representatives in 1841.
He served as member of the State constitutional convention of Ohio in 1850.

Congress 
Smith was elected as a Republican to the Forty-first and Forty-second Congresses (March 4, 1869 – March 3, 1873).

Later career and death 
He resumed the practice of law.
He served as member of the State constitutional convention of 1873.

He died in Hillsboro, Ohio, March 7, 1892.
He was interred in Hillsboro Cemetery.

Sources

1814 births
1892 deaths
Miami University alumni
People from Hillsboro, Ohio
Ohio lawyers
Ohio Constitutional Convention (1850)
Ohio Constitutional Convention (1873)
Republican Party members of the Ohio House of Representatives
19th-century American politicians
19th-century American lawyers
Republican Party members of the United States House of Representatives from Ohio